The Comprido River is a river of São Paulo state in southeastern Brazil. Rising in the municipality of Jacareí, it follows the boundary with São José dos Campos and before discharging into the Paraíba do Sul.

See also
List of rivers of São Paulo

References

Rivers of São Paulo (state)